CDP-4-dehydro-6-deoxyglucose reductase is an enzyme that catalyzes the chemical reaction

CDP-4-dehydro-3,6-dideoxy-D-glucose + NAD(P)+ + H2O  CDP-4-dehydro-6-deoxy-D-glucose + NAD(P)H + H+

The 4 substrates of this enzyme are CDP-4-dehydro-3,6-dideoxy-D-glucose, nicotinamide adenine dinucleotide ion, nicotinamide adenine dinucleotide phosphate ion, and water, whereas its 4 products are CDP-4-dehydro-6-deoxy-D-glucose, nicotinamide adenine dinucleotide, nicotinamide adenine dinucleotide phosphate, and hydrogen ion.

This enzyme belongs to the family of oxidoreductases, specifically those acting on CH or CH2 groups with NAD+ or NADP+ as acceptor. The systematic name of this enzyme class is CDP-4-dehydro-3,6-dideoxy-D-glucose:NAD(P)+ 3-oxidoreductase. Other names in common use include CDP-4-keto-6-deoxyglucose reductase, cytidine diphospho-4-keto-6-deoxy-D-glucose reductase, cytidine diphosphate 4-keto-6-deoxy-D-glucose-3-dehydrogenase, CDP-4-keto-deoxy-glucose reductase, CDP-4-keto-6-deoxy-D-glucose-3-dehydrogenase system, and NAD(P)H:CDP-4-keto-6-deoxy-D-glucose oxidoreductase. This enzyme participates in starch and sucrose metabolism.

References

 
 
 

EC 1.17.1
NADPH-dependent enzymes
NADH-dependent enzymes
Enzymes of unknown structure